The 1989–90 UCLA Bruins men's basketball team represented the University of California, Los Angeles in the 1989–90 NCAA Division I men's basketball season. The Bruins started the season ranked 13th in the AP Poll. Jim Harrick in his second year as head coach for the Bruins, led them to a 4th place in the Pac-10. UCLA went on to the NCAA tournament where they advanced to the Sweet Sixteen, before losing to Duke 81–90.

Starting lineup

Roster

Schedule

|-
!colspan=9 style=|Regular Season

|-
!colspan=12 style="background:#;"| Pac-10 Tournament

|-
!colspan=12 style="background:#;"| NCAA tournament

Source

References

UCLA Bruins men's basketball seasons
Ucla
Ucla
NCAA
NCAA